Abra of Poitiers (c. 343 – c. 360) was the daughter of Hilary of Poitiers. Abra herself has been recognized as a saint.

She was born before her father converted to Christianity and was made a bishop. At her father's advice, she took the vow of virginity. During her father's exile from Poitiers, she and her mother remained there. She died shortly after his return in 360, supposedly at the age of seventeen or eighteen.

She is remembered for her work among the poor and spreading of Christianity in the area around Poitiers, France.

Her feast day is celebrated on 12 December in Poitiers.

References

4th-century births
4th-century deaths
4th-century Roman women
4th-century Christian saints
Gallo-Roman saints